Teepee is a ghost town located in the Cassiar Land District of British Columbia. The town is situated near the junction of Teepee and Warm Creeks.

References

Ghost towns in British Columbia